Abraham Code (December 28, 1828 – March 23, 1898) was an Ontario businessman and political figure. He represented Lanark South in the Legislative Assembly of Ontario from 1869 to 1879.

He was born in Lanark Township in 1828 and educated there. He served as reeve for Drummond Township from 1860 to 1875. Code built a large woollen mill at Carleton Place in 1871; he was forced to close it due to financial difficulties in 1878.  He was elected to the provincial legislature in an 1869 by-election held after the death of William McNairn Shaw. Code joined the federal Ministry of Internal Revenue as an Inspector of Weights and Measures in 1880. He died in Ottawa in 1898. He is buried in Beechwood Cemetery.

External links 

Beckwith: Irish and Scottish Identities in a Canadian Community, GJ Lockwood
The Canadian parliamentary companion and annual register, 1879, CH Mackintosh

1828 births
1898 deaths
Progressive Conservative Party of Ontario MPPs